"Everglow" is a song by British rock band Coldplay. It is the fourth track from their seventh studio album, A Head Full of Dreams. It features uncredited guest vocals by Gwyneth Paltrow, who at the time was married to Chris Martin despite their separation being announced in 2014. The track premiered during Zane Lowe's Beats 1 radio show on 26 November 2015 and was originally released as a promotional single for the album on 27 November 2015.

On 11 November 2016, however, the song was released as the fifth single from the album through a newly recorded stripped-down version, which was inspired by Martin's unrehearsed solo performance of the song at the recent Glastonbury Festival. This recording ends with a sample of Muhammad Ali's 1977 speech in Newcastle upon Tyne.

Composition
The track revolves around a heartfelt piano riff and was written in the key of C# Minor at 73 BPM and a chord progression that alternates between C#m-A-E-G#m7 and C#m-A-E-B.

Background
Martin came up with the idea for the title of the song from a slang word he heard from a surfer. In an interview with Zane Lowe, he explained the origin of the phrase: "I was in the ocean one day with this surfer guy, who spoke just like you'd imagine a surfer guy to speak … This guy spoke like Sean Penn's character from Fast Times at Ridgemont High. He was like, 'Yo dude, I was doing this thing the other day man, it gave me this total everglow!'"

Live performance
The song was debuted during the iHeartRadio album release party of A Head Full of Dreams, on 19 November 2015. On June 26, 2016, Coldplay performed at Glastonbury Festival and after introducing the band, Chris Martin announced they were going to play Everglow. Chris' piano was out of tune causing Martin to stop and do the song in a key down, so he played the song with the piano, without the other members of the band. Days later, on July 3, 2016, the band started to play that stripped back version of Everglow, and on November 11, 2016 it was released as the final single of the album because of how much they liked the live performance.

Music video
An initial video directed by Joe Connor was filmed at the Eisstadion am Pferdeturm in Hanover on 30 June 2016, but was unreleased. This video was leaked online in 2017. Another video filmed by Ben Mor, featuring Chris Martin performing the song on a grand piano, was released on 9 December 2016.

Track listing

Personnel

Credits are adapted from A Head Full of Dreams liner notes.

Coldplay
Guy Berryman – bass guitar
Jonny Buckland – guitar
Will Champion – drums, drum pad, percussion, backing vocals
Chris Martin – lead vocals, piano

Additional musicians
Mikkel S Eriksen – additional instruments, production, mixing
Tor Erik Hermansen – additional instruments, production, mixing
Gwyneth Paltrow – backing vocals
Davide Rossi – strings
Rik Simpson – additional instruments, backing vocals, mixing

Charts

Weekly charts

Year-end charts

Certifications

Release history

Notes

References

External links

2010s ballads
2015 songs
Coldplay songs
Parlophone singles
Rock ballads
Song recordings produced by Rik Simpson
Song recordings produced by Stargate (record producers)
Songs written by Chris Martin
Songs written by Jonny Buckland
Songs written by Guy Berryman
Songs written by Will Champion
British soft rock songs
Songs about Muhammad Ali